Podocarpus humbertii is a species of conifer in the family Podocarpaceae. It is endemic to Madagascar.

The plant is known from five to seven locations in forested and wooded habitat.

References

humbertii
Endemic flora of Madagascar
Endangered flora of Africa
Taxonomy articles created by Polbot
Flora of the Madagascar subhumid forests
Taxa named by David John de Laubenfels